Shaking the Tree is a 1990 American comedy-drama film directed by Duane Clark, starring Arye Gross, Gale Hansen, Doug Savant and Steven Wilde.

Cast
 Arye Gross as Barry
 Gale Hansen as John "Sully" Sullivan
 Doug Savant as Michael
 Steven Wilde as Terry "Duke" Keegan
 Courteney Cox as Kathleen
 Christina Haag as Michelle
 Michael Arabian as Nickel
 Dennis Cockrum as Bannelli
 Nathan Davis as Grandpa Sullivan
 Ron Dean as Duke's Father
 Brittney Hansen as Brigette
 Turk Muller as Ape
 Ned Schmidtke as Mr. Jack
 Maurice Chasse as Cashier
 Mik Scriba as Tony Villanova
 Barbara Robertson as Nurse
 Kirk Thatcher as Craps Player

Reception
Stephen Holden of The New York Times wrote that the "flaw at the heart" of the film was the "improbability of such cross sections of humanity ever cohering in real life."

Roger Ebert of RogerEbert.com rated the film 0.5 stars out of 4 and wrote, "The characters and their problems are both so cliched that it makes you wonder if the filmmakers had ever seen a movie before; didn't they realize how stunningly unoriginal, how worn out and overused, this material was?"

Peter Rainer of the Los Angeles Times called the film "yet another Diner wannabe".

References

External links
 
 

American comedy-drama films
1990 comedy-drama films